Şadi Üçüncü (1948, Turkey – 2004, Germany) was a Turkish-German writer.

After high school and university in Istanbul, Ücüncü moved to Germany in 1974, where he received a doctorate in business administration.

Works 
Die Stellung der Frau in der türkischen Gesellschaft (1979) 
Integrationshemmender Faktor: Ausländerfeindlichkeit in der Bundesrepublik Deutschland (1984)
"Überblick zur Theorie der Ausländerfeindlichkeit". 
Freund, gib mir deine Hand, 1986 
Fremde in mir (1988).
Gedichte für Frieden (1991) 
Die Fremdheit in Europa. Gedichte gegen Ausländerhass und über die Liebe (1994).
Zusammen mit Dir, 2003

External links
 

1948 births
2004 deaths

Turkish writers
Turkish emigrants to West Germany
German male writers